Piorun can refer to:
 , Polish Navy destroyer in World War II
Piorun (missile), Polish MANPADS
 Krzysztof Mikołaj "Piorun" Radziwiłł, a 16th-century Polish nobleman
 Polish name for the Slavic thunder god, Perun